Monte Alegre Airport , is the airport serving Monte Alegre, Brazil.

Airlines and destinations

Access

See also

List of airports in Brazil

References

External links

Airports in Pará